Waves is the second album by the band Moving Mountains. It was released on May 11, 2011 on Triple Crown Records. The band has stated that Triple Crown Records gave them full freedom to record and write the album as they pleased. The lyrics were written by Gregory Dunn, some of which, like Pneuma, were written about his friend who had died and touch on Dunn's existential questions of faith and existence. He has stated that this is the last album with lyrics about his deceased friend. After the success of Pneuma and the band's lifestyle shift to touring, their primary artistic vision for Waves was to create an album that would reflect how they played live. Additionally, lead vocalist Dunn said, "Our goal with Waves was to have someone be engaged from the start to the end." Although the album borrows directly from their previous work on Pneuma and Foreword, the band has described the album as athematic, "un-poetic and almost clumsy, [but] really honest."

Track listing

Personnel
Moving Mountains members
 Gregory Dunn - lead vocals, guitar, trombone
 Nicholas Pizzolato - drums
 Mitchell Lee - bass
 Joshua Kirby - guitar, backing vocals
 Frank Graniero - guitar, vocals

Additional personnel
 Caitlin Grace Bailey - cello
 Kenny Bridges - additional vocals
 Sam Kaufman - art direction, design
 Mark Jourdian - management
 Cody Delong - booking
 Mike Kalajian - mastering
 Matt Goldman - mixing
 Rob Pizzolato - photography

References

2011 albums
Triple Crown Records albums
Moving Mountains (band) albums